Saturnin Pandi (1932–1996) was a soukous recording artist, conga player, in the Republic of the Congo (Congo-Brazzaville) and in the Democratic Republic of the Congo (DRC). He was one of the founding members of the soukous band TPOK Jazz, formed in 1956, led by François Luambo Makiadi, which dominated the Congolese music scene from the 1950s through the 1980s. He was also a member of the Bantous de la Capitale, formed, in Brazzaville in 1959, led by Jean Serge Essous.

External links
 Overview of Composition of TPOK Jazz

See also
 Franco Luambo Makiadi
 Sam Mangwana
 Josky Kiambukuta
 Simaro Lutumba
 Ndombe Opetum
 Youlou Mabiala
 Mose Fan Fan
 Wuta Mayi
 TPOK Jazz
 List of African musicians

References

Democratic Republic of the Congo musicians
Republic of the Congo musicians
Soukous musicians
1996 deaths
1932 births
TPOK Jazz members
Belgian Congo people